The Digha–Malda Town Express is an Express train belonging to Eastern Railway zone that runs between  and  in India. It is currently being operated with 13417/13418 train numbers on a weekly basis.

Service

The 13417/Digha–Malda Town Express has an average speed of 45 km/hr and covers 656 km in 14h 30m. The 13418/Malda Town–Digha Express has an average speed of 44 km/hr and covers 656 km in 10h 35m.

Route and stops 

The important stops of the train are:

Coach composition

The train has standard ICF rakes with max speed of 110 kmph. The train consists of 12 coaches:

 1 AC III Tier
 3 sleeper coaches
 6 general
 2 seating cum luggage rake

Traction

Both trains are hauled by an Asansol Loco Shed-based WAM-4 electric locomotive from Digha to Durgapur and thence by an Andal Loco Shed-based WDM-3A diesel locomotive to Malda Town and back.

Direction reversal

Train reverses its direction:

Rake sharing 

The train shares its rake with 13425/13426 Surat-Malda Town Express

See also 

 Malda Town railway station
 Digha railway station
 Surat-Malda Town Express
 Howrah–Digha Super AC Express
 Paharia Express

Notes

References

External links 

 13417/Digha–Malda Town Express
 13418/Malda Town–Digha Express

Transport in Digha
Transport in Maldah
Express trains in India
Rail transport in West Bengal
Railway services introduced in 2012